Jorge L. "Georgie" González Otero (born May 16, 1957) is a Puerto Rican politician and the current mayor of Jayuya. González is affiliated with the Popular Democratic Party (PPD) and has served as mayor since 1997.

Early years and studies

Jorge González Otero was born in Jayuya on May 16, 1957. He is the eight of nine children born to farmer Ramón González and Antonia Otero.

González completed his elementary and high school studies in his hometown. In 1975, he is admitted to the University of Puerto Rico at Mayagüez. In 1980, he graduated with a Bachelor's degree in Agronomy. He also took courses on Real Estate and Appraisals.

Professional career

González began working as an agricultural scientist for the Corporation of Rural Development. He also worked as administrator of the Center of Machinery in Utuado.

Political career

González became Mayor of Jayuya after being elected at the 1996 general election. After that, he has been elected four consecutive terms until the present.

Personal life

González married Hilda M. Huertas on July 30, 1977, who worked as Administrative Secretary of the Agricultural Extension of Jayuya. They have three children together: Jorge O., Marially, and Jorge L.

References

External links
Jorge González Otero Biography

1957 births
Living people
Mayors of places in Puerto Rico
People from Jayuya, Puerto Rico
Popular Democratic Party (Puerto Rico) politicians
University of Puerto Rico alumni